Football Club Rozova Dolina Kazanlak or simply known as Rozova Dolina is a Bulgarian association football club based in the town of Kazanlak, Stara Zagora Province, which currently competes in the South-East Third League, the third division of Bulgarian football. Their home ground since 1968 has been the Sevtopolis Stadium. The club's name is translated as Rose Valley and is named after the homonymous Rose Valley region of central Bulgaria, which also encompasses the town of Kazanlak.

History
The club was formed in 1948 as DNA Kazanlak, a football club characterized by its trademark red and white jerseys. In 1982-83, the team played at the top of the Bulgarian football league system, the A Group, but was subsequently relegated after only one season in the top flight, finishing in 15th place. The team did have some memorable moments from its only season in the top level, as Rozova Dolina managed to defeat eventual champions CSKA Sofia at home 2-0 and draw against the runner up Levski Sofia 1-1 also at home.

Mermekliev Era: 2016–present
On January 15, 2016, following the team's return from the winter break, the club announced that they have reached an agreement with the local Bulgarian businessman Georgi Mermekliev, who would take over at the helm of the club. He subsequently announced his intentions to bring Rozova Dolina's previous glory over the years and that the team will be battling for promotion for the A Group in the very next seasons. He also stated that the club stadium  would be renovated and upgraded to 12,000 seats and a new academy would be established. Subsequently, Rozova Dolona announced a sponsorship with a new kit manufacturer, Legea for the upcoming season. Following a great number of investments, on September 14, 2016, Rozova Dolina qualified for the Bulgarian Cup competition after 15 years absence from professional football.

Honours
Cup of Bulgarian Amateur Football League:
 Winners (1): 2020–21

Shirt and sponsors
Rozova Dolina main colors are red, with white away colors.

Current squad

Notable players 
The following players included were either playing for their respective national teams or left good impression among the fans. 

  Todor Yanchev
  Hristo Yanev
  Anton Spasov
  Ivo Ivanov
  Vladislav Yamukov
  Yordan Filipov
  Kancho Yordanov

Managers

Past seasons

League positions

References

External links
Fan site

Rozova Dolina
1948 establishments in Bulgaria
Kazanlak